Mare of Easttown is an American crime drama limited series created and written by Brad Ingelsby for HBO. Directed by Craig Zobel, the series premiered on April 18, 2021, and concluded on May 30, 2021, consisting of seven episodes. It stars Kate Winslet as the title character, a detective investigating a murder in a small town near Philadelphia. Julianne Nicholson, Jean Smart, Angourie Rice, Evan Peters, Sosie Bacon, David Denman, Neal Huff, James McArdle, Guy Pearce, Cailee Spaeny, John Douglas Thompson, and Joe Tippett appear in supporting roles.

Mare of Easttown was acclaimed by critics, who lauded its story, characters, acting, and representation of women. The series received 16 nominations at the 73rd Primetime Emmy Awards and won four, including Outstanding Lead Actress for Winslet, Outstanding Supporting Actor for Peters, and Outstanding Supporting Actress for Nicholson.

Premise
In a suburb of Philadelphia, police detective Marianne "Mare" Sheehan investigates the recent murder of a teenage mother while trying to keep her own life from falling apart. Mare is a local hero, having been the star of a high school basketball championship game 25 years earlier. She has also been unable to solve the case of another missing young girl for a year, leading many in the community to doubt her detective skills. Her personal troubles include a divorce, a son lost to suicide, and a custody battle with her son’s formerly heroin addicted girlfriend over Mare's grandson.

Cast and characters

Main
Kate Winslet as Marianne "Mare" Sheehan, a detective sergeant in Easttown, Pennsylvania, who is investigating the murder of one young girl and the disappearance of another
Julianne Nicholson as Lori Ross, Mare's closest friend
Jean Smart as Helen Fahey, Mare's mother
Angourie Rice as Siobhan Sheehan, Mare's daughter
David Denman as Frank Sheehan, Mare's ex-husband
Neal Huff as Father Dan Hastings, Mare's cousin, a Catholic priest and the pastor of St. Michael's Church
Guy Pearce as Richard Ryan, an author and creative writing professor
Cailee Spaeny as Erin McMenamin, a teenage single mother who is treated badly by her ex-boyfriend
John Douglas Thompson as Chief Carter, Mare's boss at the police department
Joe Tippett as John Ross, Lori's husband and cousin of Erin's father Kenny
Evan Peters as Detective Colin Zabel, the county detective called in to assist Mare
Sosie Bacon as Carrie Layden, the mother of Mare's grandson Drew and ex-girlfriend of Mare's deceased son Kevin 
James McArdle as Deacon Mark Burton, a Catholic deacon reassigned to St. Michael's after sexual misconduct allegations at his previous parish

Supporting
 
Kate Arrington as Faye, Frank's fiancée
Ruby Cruz as Jess Riley, Erin's best friend
Ned Eisenberg as Detective Hauser, a county detective
Enid Graham as Dawn Bailey, an Easttown resident whose daughter, Katie, has been missing for over a year
Deborah Hedwall as Judy Zabel, Colin's mother with whom he lives
Caitlin Houlahan as Katie Bailey, a girl who went missing from Easttown a year prior
Cameron Mann as Ryan Ross, Lori and John's son
Jack Mulhern as Dylan Hinchey, Erin's ex-boyfriend
Patrick Murney as Kenny McMenamin, Erin's father
Chinasa Ogbuagu as Beth Hanlon, Freddie's sister and Mare and Dawn's close friend
Phyllis Somerville as Betty Carroll, an elderly Easttown resident; this was Somerville's final role before her death in 2020
Robbie Tann as Billy Ross, John's brother, Lori's brother-in-law and Kenny's cousin 
Madeline Weinstein as Becca, Siobhan's stoner girlfriend

Other
 
Rosa Arredondo as Tammy, a former sex worker and friend of Mare's who works as an informant for her
Debbie Campbell as Katherine Hinchey, Dylan's mother
Gordon Clapp as Pat Ross, John and Billy’s father
Eisa Davis as Gayle Graham, Mare's therapist
Sasha Frolova as Missy Sager, an escort
Jeremy Gabriel as Steve Hinchey, Dylan's father
Connie Giordano as Patty Del Rasso, Brianna's mother
Justin Hurtt-Dunkley as Officer Trammel
Dominique Johnson as Freddie Hanlon, Beth's opioid-addicted brother
Izzy King as Drew Sheehan, Mare's grandson, born to her son Kevin and his girlfriend Carrie Layden
Cody Kostro as Kevin Sheehan, Mare's late son who died by suicide prior to the events of the series
Jeb Kreager as Wayne Potts, a resident of Easttown
Katie Kreisler as Trish Riley, Jess' mother
Mackenzie Lansing as Brianna Del Rasso, Dylan's girlfriend
Patrick McDade as Glen Carroll, Betty's husband
Kiah McKirnan as Anne Harris, a DJ at the Haverford College radio show where Siobhan's band performs
Patsy Meck as Jan Kelly, an employee at the Easttown police station
Eric T. Miller as Tony Del Rasso, Brianna's father, a restaurant owner
Kassie Mundhenk as Moira Ross, Lori and John's daughter, who has Down syndrome
Anthony Norman as Nathan Forde, a member of Siobhan's band
Drew Scheid as Geoff Gabeheart, one of Siobhan's friends, drummer in Siobhan's band Androgynous
Sadat Waddy as Sean, Dylan's friend

Episodes

Production

Development
In January 2019, it was reported that Brad Ingelsby, creator of the limited series, would write all episodes, with Gavin O'Connor directing. Executive producers include Ingelsby, O'Connor, Kate Winslet, Paul Lee, Mark Roybal, and Gordon Gray. In January 2020, it was announced that Craig Zobel would replace O'Connor as director due to scheduling issues and also serve as executive producer.

Regarding the setting, Ingelsby stated "sort of an amalgam" which he explained "It’s Coatesville, it’s Aston, it’s Drexel Hill." Ingelsby stated that he chose the name Easttown because "it sounded like such a generic town name."

Casting
It was announced in January 2019 that Kate Winslet had been cast to star in the HBO miniseries that would be filmed on location in suburban Philadelphia. In September 2019, the cast was rounded out with Julianne Nicholson, Jean Smart, Angourie Rice, Evan Peters, Cailee Spaeny and David Denman. John Douglas Thompson, Patrick Murney, Ben Miles, Katie Kreisler,  James McArdle, Sosie Bacon, Joe Tippett, Neal Huff were cast in October 2019. In February 2021, it was announced that Guy Pearce joined the cast, replacing Miles in his role. In the same month, Mackenzie Lansing, Kate Arrington, Ruby Cruz, James Easter Bradford, Elisa Davis, Enid Graham, Justin Hurtt-Dunkley, Izzy King, Jack Mulhern,  Anthony Norman, Drew Scheid, and Madeline Weinstein were cast in the limited series.

Filming
Filming of the show began in the fall of 2019 around suburban Philadelphia and was reported to still be in progress as of March 2020, with plans to continue through April. However, production was shut down early due to the COVID-19 pandemic. In early September 2020, a Philadelphia news station reported that filming was set to resume within the month.

Because the story is set in a fictionalized version of Easttown Township in Chester County, Pennsylvania, where series creator Brad Ingelsby was born (the show moves the location east to Delaware County, which is adjacent to Easttown Twp), there were discussions about whether to use the "Delco accent", a version of Philadelphia English common in Delaware County. It was Winslet who insisted that the accent be used, despite being a particularly difficult accent to learn, because she felt the community itself was an important character in the story, and the authentic accent would help emphasize that. "There were a lot of things I could have really leant into that would have made it sound like I was doing something a bit gimmicky and I didn't want that to happen," Winslet said. "So I just had to drill it and drill it and drill it." She claimed that learning the accent was so difficult that it caused her to "throw things". A dialect coach named Susanne Sulby assisted the actors.

Filming locations include a train station and high-school gymnasium in Coatesville, Pennsylvania (a city in Chester County), and an American Legion hall in Ogden, a community in Delaware County. Inglesby has said that many of the filming locations were around Aston Township, in Delaware County. Winslet reportedly said that, while filming the show, she became obsessed with Wawa convenience stores. "Wawa was a big part of my life for well over a year," she said. Wawa stores were used as scouting locations for the production's costume designers.

Release and reception
The seven-episode limited series premiered on April 18, 2021, and concluded on May 30, 2021. The limited series was released on Blu-ray and DVD by Warner Bros. Home Entertainment on September 14, 2021.

Critical response

Mare of Easttown received critical acclaim. On review aggregator Rotten Tomatoes, the series has an approval rating of 95% based on 128 reviews, with an average rating of 8.1/10. The website's critics consensus reads, "Grounded by a career-best Kate Winslet, Mare of Easttowns ambitions at times exceed its reach, but its central mystery is supported by such strong sense of place and character it hardly matters." On Metacritic, the series has a weighted average score of 81 out of 100 based on reviews from 42 critics, indicating "universal acclaim".

Winslet received widespread praise for her performance, including from Lucy Mangan of The Guardian who wrote, "If you can have a defining performance this late in a career, this is surely Winslet's. She is absolutely wonderful." Alex Abad-Santos of Vox described Winslet's performance as "mesmerizing", adding that "she allows us to see the ugliness Mare is capable of and how obsessive, perhaps even abusive, she can be when she's threatened." The Wall Street Journals Dorothy Rabinowitz noted "Winslet's eloquent command of the role is obvious from the outset". Ben Travers of IndieWire wrote, "Winslet's immersed performance could carry a far lesser work by itself", while adding that her East American dialect is "convincing and her physical work is flawless." Richard Roeper of the Chicago Sun-Times declared, "Winslet adds to a long list of magnificent, disappear-into-the-character performances...one of the most resonant performances of her career." Caryn James of the BBC wrote, "Winslet makes an unglamorous return to TV...and her fierce, ordinary heroine is gloriously real."

Inkoo Kang of The Hollywood Reporter gave it a mostly positive review describing it as "uneven, but masterfully suspenseful". Kang compared the series with British crime drama Happy Valley, a comparison echoed by Fiona Sturges of The Independent, who wrote that "addiction, abuse and death were woven into the fabric of life" in both dramas, while acknowledging similarities between both shows' protagonists. The New York Times was dismissive in its review, with television critic Mike Hale writing: "Some style in the direction or honest feeling in the screenplay could have mitigated the dreariness, but 'Mare' doesn't offer much beyond Ben Richardson's burnished cinematography." A plot twist in the final episode received lukewarm reviews from various outlets. For The A.V. Club, Joshua Alston wrote, "While [the final episode] is a triumphant conclusion to Mare's emotional arc, as a conclusion to a mystery, it's a mixed bag [...] the whole thing just feels arbitrary and confusing and lacks the emotional logic this show is normally so good at." In Decider, Sean T. Collins agreed but praised the leads' performances, writing, "The resolution of the mystery is a bit 'twists and fake-outs for twists' and fake-outs' sake.' But each new revelation came with an emotionally devastating payload for the characters, with Winslet and Nicholson in particular doing their best work of the series."

Critics and viewers have also particularly praised the series and Winslet for convincingly replicating the Philadelphia regional accent, an oddity in mainstream media. The specific version of the Philadelphia accent is known as the "Delco accent", after Delaware County to the west of Philadelphia. The characters' accents, along with their fondness for Wawa, were parodied in a May 2021 Saturday Night Live sketch.

Ratings 
Mare of Easttown proved to be a record breaking ratings hit. The massive viewership resulted in HBO Max servers crashing shortly after the finale was released on the streaming service.

The final episode of Mare of Easttown drew four million viewers over the holiday weekend across HBO and HBO Max, with nearly three million viewers Sunday night (all platforms), marking a series high for both linear and digital, according to HBO. The finale also set the record as the most watched episode of an original series on HBO Max during its first 24 hours of availability, besting the finales of The Undoing and The Flight Attendant over the same period of time. Mare of Easttown also joined The Undoing as the only series in HBO's history to see consecutive growth week-to-week.

Accolades

Potential second season
Though the program was intended as a limited series, Winslet stated in August 2021 that she "would love to return" as Mare, and that for a potential second season, Ingelsby "has shared some very cool ideas. We will see what happens. I also have to figure out if I can do it. Can I go through it again? It did cost me a lot emotionally to be her, and I have to figure out if I can summon it all up again and do it again."

References

External links
 

2020s American crime drama television series
2020s American drama television miniseries
2021 American television series debuts
2021 American television series endings
English-language television shows
HBO original programming
Serial drama television series
Television shows filmed in Pennsylvania
Television shows set in Philadelphia
Television productions suspended due to the COVID-19 pandemic
Television series by Home Box Office